Omar Sharif Jr. (born 28 November 1983) is a Canadian actor, model, author and gay activist who currently lives in the United States.

Early life

Sharif is the son of a Jewish Canadian mother, Debbie, and an Egyptian father, Tarek Sharif. His paternal grandparents were Omar Sharif and Faten Hamama, both Egyptian actors; his maternal grandparents were Jewish Holocaust survivors. During his childhood, Sharif was shuttled back and forth among Montreal, Paris, and Cairo. He has a B.A. from Queen's University, a Master's in Comparative Politics from the London School of Economics and a degree in Performing Arts from The Lee Strasberg Institute.

Career

Sharif has worked as an actor, appearing in the 2000 Egyptian miniseries Wagh el qamar, the 2005-6 French-language Canadian series Virginie, the 2008 Egyptian film Hassan wa Morcus and the 2016 Irish film The Secret Scripture. When he became an actor, his grandfather said to him: “I gave you my name, I gave you my looks. I'm not going to give you anything else. You have to do it entirely on your own.”

He appeared in the 2017 short film 11th Hour, which was selected for screening at the TriBeCa Film Festival.

He has also worked as a model: He was “the face of Coca-Cola for the Arabic world and appeared in a major Calvin Klein print campaign in Egypt.”

He was a presenter at the 83rd Annual Academy Awards in 2011, during which he performed a memorable comedic sketch with Kirk Douglas.

Activism

In 2012, Sharif came out as gay in The Advocate, a gay newsmagazine. Noting that the recent parliamentary elections in Egypt had “dealt secularists a particularly devastating blow,” he stated that the vision of “a freer, more equal Egypt — a vision that many young patriots gave their lives to see realized in Tahrir Square — has been hijacked.” He is said to be “the first public personality to ever come out as openly gay in the Arab World.” His announcement led to widespread criticism and threats of violence.

From 2013 to 2015, he was the National Spokesperson for the Gay and Lesbian Alliance Against Defamation (GLAAD). In May 2015, he was hired to handle community affairs by New York developer Ian Reisner.

In an August 2015 interview, Sharif said that his recently deceased grandfather, Omar Sharif, had been aware of his homosexuality and had never had a problem with it, though his mother did; she told him "Don't tell your grandmother, this would kill her." He responded, "She survived Auschwitz but this would kill her?"

He also said he hoped to change Egyptian attitudes toward gay people. “I’m a son, I’m a brother, I’m a coworker, I’m a friend,” he said. “I’m not a fact, or a figure, or a statistic. I’m not a moral or an ethical debate.”

Sharif gave a speech at the 2016 Oslo Freedom Forum discussing his coming out story during Arab Spring and admitting to suicidal thoughts.

After the Sultan of Brunei passed a law to stone homosexual people in April 2019, Sharif Jr. challenged him a few days later. If the Sultan would execute his own homosexual son, Sharif Jr. would execute himself as well.

Personal life
As of 2012 he was living in Cairo, however shortly thereafter, uneasy about the “new Egypt,” he left the country. He now resides in Los Angeles.

Filmography

Television

Film

Bibliography
 A Tale of Two Omars: A Memoir of Family, Revolution, and Coming Out During the Arab Spring (October 5, 2021),

Honors and awards

He was honored as one of the “Out 100” in 2012,”  The Advocate's "40 Under 40" in 2014 and 2015, and won Attitude Magazine's 'Inspiration Award' in 2016.

References

External links
 

1983 births
Living people
Activists from Montreal
Alumni of the London School of Economics
Queen's University at Kingston alumni
Canadian activists
Canadian male film actors
Canadian male models
Canadian male television actors
Egyptian Jews
Egyptian activists
Egyptian male film actors
Egyptian male models
Egyptian male television actors
Canadian expatriates in England
Canadian gay actors
Jewish Canadian male actors
Jewish male models
Jews from Quebec
Gay Jews
Gay Muslims
Gay models
Canadian gay writers
Egyptian LGBT rights activists
Egyptian LGBT actors
Canadian LGBT rights activists
Male actors from Montreal
Models from Montreal
Yiddish-speaking people
Canadian people of Israeli descent
Egyptian people of Israeli descent
21st-century Canadian male actors
21st-century Egyptian male actors
21st-century Canadian LGBT people